Daxing Jichang (Daxing Airport) station is a station on the Daxing Airport Express of the Beijing Subway, and the Beijing–Xiong'an intercity railway of China Railway.

Opening time 
The subway station for Daxing Airport Express of Beijing Subway opened on September 26, 2019.

The railway station for Beijing–Xiong'an intercity railway also opened on September 26, 2019. The railway station for Intercity Railway Connector will open in 2023.

Description 
A ground transportation center was constructed beneath the North Terminal of Beijing Daxing International Airport. Two underground railway stations (for Beijing–Xiong'an intercity railway and Intercity Railway Connector) and three metro stations (Daxing Airport Express, Line 20 (Line R4) and another planned metro line) were built beneath the North Terminal. Currently, only one of the metro lines (Daxing Airport Express) and one of the railway lines (Beijing–Xiong'an intercity railway) are in operation.

Gallery

Subway Station

Railway Station

Notes

References 

Airport railway stations in China
Guangyang District
Railway stations in Hebei
Railway stations in China opened in 2019
Stations on the Beijing–Xiong'an intercity railway